The Anomophthalmini comprise a weevil tribe in the subfamily Entiminae.

Genera 
 Anomophthalmus
 Sysciophthalmus

References 

 Morrone, J.J. 1998: The impact of cladistics on weevil classification, with a new scheme of families and subfamilies (Coleoptera: Curculionoidea). Trends in Entomology, 1 (1997): 129–136.
 Alonso-Zarazaga, M.A.; Lyal, C.H.C. 1999: A world catalogue of families and genera of Curculionoidea (Insecta: Coleoptera) (excepting Scolytidae and Platypodidae). Entomopraxis, Barcelona

External links 

Entiminae
Beetle tribes